Víctor Chust García (born 5 March 2000) is a Spanish professional footballer who plays for La Liga club Cádiz.

Career
After receiving a start in the 2020–21 Copa del Rey against Alcoyano on 21 January 2021, which finished in a 2–1 defeat, Chust made his La Liga debut on 9 February 2021, after coming on as a late substitute in a 2–0 victory over Getafe. In August 2021, he was loaned for the 2021–22 season to Cádiz CF.

On 6 July 2022, Cádiz and Real Madrid reached an agreement over the permanent transfer of Chust to the Andalusian club, with Madrid keeping a percentage of his rights.

Career statistics

Honours
Real Madrid
UEFA Youth League: 2019–20

Spain U17
UEFA European Under-17 Championship: 2017
FIFA Under-17 World Cup: Runner-up 2017

Spain U19
UEFA European Under-19 Championship: 2019

References

External links
Real Madrid profile

2000 births
Living people
Spanish footballers
Association football defenders
Spain youth international footballers
Spain under-21 international footballers
Segunda División B players
La Liga players
Valencia CF players
Real Madrid CF players
Real Madrid Castilla footballers
Cádiz CF players
Footballers from Valencia (city)